Thunder Seven is the seventh studio album by Canadian hard rock band Triumph, released in November 1984. Three songs on the  second half of the album follow a concept based on time-related themes.

The album was certified gold in the US by the RIAA, with sales of over 500,000 copies, on April 21, 2003, almost nineteen years after its initial release.

"Follow Your Heart" was the band's highest charting single of the time, reaching #88 in both the UK and the US. "Spellbound" was also released as a single, though it didn't prove as successful, only charting in Canada and barely scraping the top 100.

Thunder Seven was the last Triumph album that did not feature any outside writers.  All prior Triumph albums, with the exception of 1977's Rock & Roll Machine, were written entirely by the band members.

Artwork
The album cover was illustrated by artist Dean Motter and was a mechanized version of the Vitruvian Man by Leonardo da Vinci. The cover is a visible element of the album's concept, in which the band examines the actions and abnormalities of man at the turn of the 21st century.

Track listing
All tracks written by Gil Moore, Mike Levine and Rik Emmett, except where noted.

Side one 
 "Spellbound" – 5:11
 "Rock Out, Roll On" – 5:18
 "Cool Down" – 4:51
 "Follow Your Heart" – 3:27

Side two 
 "Time Goes By" – 6:02
 "Midsummer's Daydream" (Rik Emmett) – 1:41
 "Time Canon" – 1:31
 "Killing Time" – 4:14
 "Stranger in a Strange Land" – 5:15
 "Little Boy Blues" – 3:43

Singles 
"Follow Your Heart"/"Stranger in a Strange Land" - MCA 52540; released December 8, 1984 (US, Canada and UK)
"Spellbound"/"Cool Down" - MCA-52520; released December 8, 1984 (Canada, UK and US)
"Killing Time"/"Rock Out Roll On" - MCA 52635; Promo; December 15, 1984 (US and Canada)

Personnel
 Rik Emmett – vocals, guitars, bass guitar, music sequencer, Prophet 5 synthesizer, Roland Jupiter 8, Synclavier, Fairlight CMI Series III , Clavinet, bass pedals
 Gil Moore – drums, percussion, vocals
 Michael Levine – bass guitar, keyboards, Prophet 5 synthesizer, Synclavier, organ, Clavinet, bass pedals

with

 Lou Pomanti – synthesizer, keyboards, programming, producer
 Al Rogers – background vocals
 Sandee Bathgate – background vocals
 Dave Dickson – background vocals
 Herb Moore – background vocals
 Andy Holland – background vocals

Production
 Eddie Kramer – producer, mixer
 Ed Stone – engineer
 Hugh Cooper – mixing
 Noel Golden – assistant engineer
 Yoshiro Kuzumaki – mastering on original LP
 Bob Ludwig – mastering on CD issues
 Brett Zilahi – re-mastering on 2004 re-issue
 Dean Motter – art direction, illustration, design

Charts

Certifications

References

External links
 Thunder Seven entry at The Official Triumph Homepage
 Thunder Seven Analysis Discussion at The Official Triumph Homepage

1984 albums
Triumph (band) albums
MCA Records albums
TMI Records albums
Concept albums
Albums produced by Eddie Kramer
Albums recorded at Metalworks Studios